Gastrodontidae is a family of air-breathing land snails, terrestrial pulmonate gastropod mollusks in the superfamily Gastrodontoidea (according to the taxonomy of the Gastropoda by Bouchet & Rocroi, 2005). 

This family has no subfamilies (according to the taxonomy of the Gastropoda by Bouchet & Rocroi, 2005).

Distribution 
The distribution of the Gastrodontidae includes the Nearctic, western-Palearctic, eastern-Palearctic, Neotropical and Hawaii.

Anatomy
Some snail species in this family use love darts made of cartilage.

In this family, the number of haploid chromosomes lies between 26 and 30 (according to the values in this table).

Genera 
Genera within the family include:
 Gastrodonta Albers, 1850 - type species of the family
 Aegopinella Lindholm, 1927
 Archaegopis Wenz in K. Fischer & Wenz, 1914 †
 Atlantica Ancey, 1887
 Glyphyalinia E. von Martens, 1892
  Godwinia Sykes, 1900
 Janulus Lowe, 1852
 Janulus bifrons (R. T. Lowe, 1831)
 Janulus pompylius (Shuttleworth, 1852)
 Janulus stephanophorus (Deshayes, 1850)
 Mesomphix Rafinesque, 1819
 Nesovitrea C. M. Cooke, 1921
 Patulopsis Strebel & Pfeffer, 1879
 Perpolita H. B. Baker, 1928

 Poecilozonites O. Boettger, 1884 - Bermuda land snail
 Pseudohyalina Morse, 1864
 Retinella P. Fischer, 1877
 Striatura E. S. Morse, 1864
 Striatura milium (Whittemore, 1859)
 Striaturops Baker, 1928
 Ventridens W. G. Binney & Bland, 1869
 Vermetum Wollaston, 1878
 Vitrinizonites W.G. Binney, 1879
 Zonitoides Lehmann, 1862"Genera in family Gastrodontidae" [n=2]. AnimalBase, accessed 3 September 2010.
Synonyms
 Aegopina Kobelt, 1879: synonym of Retinella P. Fischer, 1877
 Alienitor Iredale, 1937: synonym of Zonitoides Lehmann, 1862 (junior synonym)
 Bermudia Ancey, 1887: synonym of Poecilozonites O. Boettger, 1884
 Edusa Albers, 1860: synonym of Mesomphix (Moreletia) Gray, 1855 represented as Mesomphix Rafinesque, 1819
 Glyphognomon H. B. Baker, 1930: synonym of Glyphyalinia E. von Martens, 1892
 Glyphyaloides H. B. Baker, 1930: synonym of Glyphyalus H. B. Baker, 1928
 Juno Mazyck, 1889: synonym of Poecilozonites O. Boettger, 1884
 Namoitena Iredale, 1933: synonym of Mesomphix (Omphalina) Rafinesque, 1831 represented as Mesomphix Rafinesque, 1819
 Omphalina Rafinesque, 1831: synonym of Mesomphix (Omphalina) Rafinesque, 1831 represented as Mesomphix Rafinesque, 1819 (original rank)
 Politenella Balashov, 2016: synonym of Aegopinella Lindholm, 1927
 Zonitellus H. B. Baker, 1928: synonym of Zonitoides Lehmann, 1862

 Cladogram 
A cladogram showing phylogenic relations of families in the limacoid clade:

References

 Further reading 
 Schileyko A. A. (2003). "Treatise on recent terrestrial pulmonate mollusks. 10. Ariophantidae, Ostracolethaidae, Ryssotidae, Milacidae, Dyakiidae, Staffordiidae, Gastrodontidae, Zonitidae, Daudebardiidae, Parmacellidae". Ruthenica'', Supplement 2. 1309-1466.

External links 
 

 
Gastropod families